Nilea is a genus of flies in the family Tachinidae.

Species
Nilea mbigua Bergstrӧm, 2007
Nilea anatolica Mesnil, 1954
Nilea breviunguis Chao & Li, 1998
Nilea brigantina Herting, 1977
Nilea carpocapsae (Townsend, 1919)
Nilea dimmocki (Webber, 1930)
Nilea disparis (Reinhard, 1959)
Nilea erebiae (Mesnil, 1963)
Nilea erecta (Coquillett, 1902)
Nilea hortulana (Meigen, 1824)
Nilea innoxia Robineau-Desvoidy, 1863
Nilea lobeliae (Coquillett, 1897)
Nilea longicauda (Mesnil, 1970)
Nilea mathesoni (Reinhard, 1937)
Nilea noctuiformis (Smith, 1915)
Nilea perplexa Mesnil, 1977
Nilea rufiscutellaris (Zetterstedt, 1859)
Nilea sternalis (Coquillett, 1902)
Nilea unipilum (Aldrich & Webber, 1924)
Nilea valens (Aldrich & Webber, 1924)
Nilea victoria (Aldrich & Webber, 1924)

References

Diptera of Europe
Diptera of Africa
Diptera of Asia
Diptera of North America
Exoristinae
Tachinidae genera
Taxa named by Jean-Baptiste Robineau-Desvoidy